Raquel Kasham Daniel is a Nigerian teacher, social entrepreneur and author of several books including FLOW: a girl's guide to menstruation. She has received numerous awards for her work with educating marginalised children in Nigeria. She is also a recipient of the African Luther King Heroes Award. She founded Beyond the Classroom Foundation as a response to the social and educational needs of underprivileged children
and created Nzuriaiki.com (now voluserve.com), an online platform that connects nonprofits with volunteers in Africa. She also co-founded Bambini Africa, creators of Bambini Books and Bambini TV.

Early life 
According to her account from interviews, Daniel is from Kaduna State and lived in Kaduna and Lagos most of her life. She is the first child in a family of four and the only girl. She lost her dad when she was six and her mother four years later.

Education
Daniel is an alumnus of University of Lagos.

Bibliography 
 My First Tracing Book (2021)
 FLOW: a girl's guide to menstruation
 Squeaky Clean
 My Big Fun Colouring Book
 My Big Fun Tracing Book
 The Alphabet Book on COVID-19
 My Personal Reading Log
 There is a New Virus in Town
 My Fun Colouring Book

Awards and recognition
African Luther King Heroes Award
 Women Social Entrepreneurs Award.
Women Achievers Award
Honour Nigeria Community Development Award.
La Roche Leadership Award

References

Living people
Nigerian social entrepreneurs
Founders of charities
Nigerian technology businesspeople
Nigerian writers
Year of birth missing (living people)